The Rockcliffe Yacht Club is a non-profit Yacht club based on the south shore of the Ottawa River near the Ottawa/Rockcliffe Airport in Ottawa, Ontario, Canada north of the Canada Aviation Museum. It is a 100-member “private co-op” style club. The club originally was part of CFB Rockcliffe but changed to a private club in 1984. The club is centred on a concrete ramp originally used to launch RCAF sea planes. The ramp extends  into the water   as when the ramp was built, in the 1930s, the level of the Ottawa river was much lower. As a result, the Rockcliffe Yacht Club has one of the best launching ramps on the Ottawa river.

See also

 CFB Rockcliffe

References

External links

Take a Virtual Cruise on the Ottawa River

History of Ottawa
Yacht clubs in Canada
Sports venues in Ottawa
Buildings and structures in Ottawa
Organizations based in Ottawa